Ubaid Chono Kadavath (born 5 February 1990), is an Indian professional footballer who plays as a goalkeeper for Sreenidi Deccan FC in the I-League.

Career
Ubaid was part of Maharashtra Santhosh Trophy squad for the year 2015. He represented the state of Maharashtra in the National Games that followed too.

ONGC
During his tenure at ONGC FC, Ubaid was declared as the Best Goalkeeper for the season 2016-17 in the First Ever MDFA Awards.

East Bengal
After his solid performance for FC Kerala in the Kerala Premier League and Gadhinglaj All India Football Tournament, Ubaid moved to Kolkata side East Bengal in a loan for the 2nd half of 2017–18 I-League.

On 25 April 2018, it is announced that Ubaid has signed a renewal contract with East Bengal which keeps the shot stopper at the club till 2020.

Career statistics

Honours

Club
Gokulam Kerala FC

 Durand Cup : 2019

 I-League
 Champions (1): 2020–21

References

1990 births
Living people
People from Kannur district
Indian footballers
Footballers from Kerala
I-League players
Dempo SC players
Air India FC players
ONGC FC players
F.C. Kerala players
East Bengal Club players
Association football goalkeepers
Sreenidi Deccan FC players